The Fiat G.55 Centauro (Italian: "Centaur") was a single-engine single-seat World War II fighter aircraft used by the Regia Aeronautica and the Aeronautica Nazionale Repubblicana in 1943–1945. It was designed and built in Turin by Fiat. The Fiat G.55 was arguably the best type produced in Italy during World War II, (a subjective claim also frequently made for the Macchi C.205 Veltro as well as for the Reggiane Re.2005 Sagittario) but it did not enter production until 1943, when, after comparative tests against the Messerschmitt Bf 109G and the Focke-Wulf 190, the Luftwaffe itself regarded the Fiat G.55 as "the best Axis fighter".

During its short operational service, mostly under the Repubblica Sociale Italiana insignia, after the 8 September 1943 armistice, this powerful, robust and fast aircraft proved itself to be an excellent interceptor at high altitude. In 1944, over Northern Italy, the Centauro clashed with British Supermarine Spitfire, P-51 Mustang, P-47 Thunderbolt and P-38 Lightning, proving to be no easy adversary.  Italian fighter pilots liked their Centauro but by the time the war ended, fewer than 300 had been built. By comparison, the Germans produced 35,000 Bf 109s.

Design and development
By 1939, all the main Italian aircraft factories had begun designing a new series of monoplane fighter aircraft, using inline engines as opposed to the radial engines that powered the first generation Italian monoplane fighters used in the early years of World War II (fighters such as the Fiat G.50 and the Macchi C.200). This process saw the first generation radial-engined fighters re-equipped with the Italian-built copy of the Daimler-Benz DB 601 engine, the so-called Serie 1/2, whose most prominent representative was the Macchi C.202 Folgore (which was an aerodynamically revised Macchi C.200- also known as Macchi C.201 - with an inline V-12 instead of a radial engine). Aircraft in this series were given alphanumeric designations ending in the number "2". However, the process didn't stop, and already in 1941, designers shifted their attention on the new, larger and more powerful Fiat RA.1050, a license-built copy of the Daimler-Benz DB 605. Aircraft powered by this new engine became the "Serie 5", and all had alphanumeric designations ending in the number "5" (Macchi C.205, Reggiane Re.2005, Fiat G.55). Fiat designer Giuseppe Gabrielli, while experimenting a new version of his Fiat G.50 fighter, equipped with the DB 601, started a new design that was to be powered by the DB 605.

The first G.55 prototype flew on 30 April 1942, piloted by commander Valentino Cus, immediately showing its good performance and flight characteristics. It was armed with one 20 mm MG 151/20 cannon with 200 rounds of ammunition, installed in the forward fuselage and firing between the cylinder banks, exiting through the propeller hub. In "Sottoserie O" airframes, there were also four 12.7 mm (.5 in) Breda-SAFAT machine guns; two in the upper engine cowling, and two in the lower cowling, firing through the propeller arc, with 300 rpg. This layout soon proved to be troublesome, both for rearming and for the servicing of the lower cowling mounted machine guns: for this reason, the two lower machine guns were removed, and replaced with a 20 mm MG 151/20 in each wing, in the later production series, the Serie 1 (for a total of three cannon and two 12.7mm machine guns, although this varied; some had machine guns in the wings instead of cannon).

The prototype flew to Guidonia, where it was put into trials against the other fighters of the so-called Serie 5: Macchi C.205V Veltro and the formidable Reggiane Re.2005 Sagittario, all of them built around the powerful, license-built Daimler-Benz DB 605 engine.
The trials showed that the Centauro was the 2nd best performer overall, and it won the tender set by the Regia Aeronautica. The C.205V was good at low and medium altitudes, fast and with good diving characteristics but its performance dropped considerably over 8,000 m (26,250 ft), particularly in handling. The Re.2005 was the fastest at high altitudes and best in dogfights, but suffered from a vibration which turned out to be a balance problem. This was corrected, but was still the most technically advanced, intricate, and therefore time-consuming of the three to produce, which made it unattractive at that stage of the war. The G.55 was chosen for mass production, along with the C.205. The G.55 prototype reached 620 km/h (390 mph), fully loaded, and without using WEP (war emergency power), at 7,000 m (22,970 ft). This was a little less than expected, but it had a strong airframe and was the best aircraft regarding handling and stability at every altitude. The only negative assessment noted by G.55 pilots was the pronounced left-hand yawing at takeoff due to the powerful engine torque. This was partially remedied by a slight offset positioning of the vertical stabilizer to counteract engine torque.

By early 1943, increased Allied bombing raids over Italy had showed that there was no suitable high-altitude fighter to deal with them effectively. The Macchi C.202's performance decreased above 8,000 m (26,250 ft), the typical altitude of the bombers and its light armament of two 12.7 mm (.5 in) and two 7.7mm (.31 in) machine guns was hardly adequate to bring down heavy bombers. Of the Serie 5 fighters, the Centauro showed the best high-altitude performance, due to its large wing surface area. Also its powerful armament, along with the generous ammunition supply (the G.55 had 250 rounds of 20 mm ammunition in the centerline cannon as opposed to 120 rounds in the Re.2005) standardized in the production Serie I, was sufficient to bring down US heavy bombers.

The Regia Aeronautica commissioned the production of 1,800 G.55s, later raising that number to 2,400. A pre-production series of 34 examples was ordered: these aircraft were mostly based on the prototype, with minor changes to improve its flying characteristics. They had a different weapon layout, as stated above, with the two lower cowling machine guns moved into the wings. Only 19 of the 34 commissioned aircraft were built, and six of them were converted to the Serie I standard at the factory.

The production version, named Serie I, had the standard armament of three 20 mm MG 151/20s and two 12.7 mm (.5 in) Breda-SAFAT machine guns, plus two underwing hardpoints, allowing it to carry either two bombs (up to 160 kg/350 lb), or two drop tanks (100 L/26 US Gal). At the date of the Armistice, 8 September 1943, 35 G.55s of all Series had been delivered, including three prototypes. Of these, only one was flown to South Italy to join the Italian Co-Belligerent Air Force (a second G.55, MM.91150, was obtained by the Allies in summer 1944, when test pilot, Serafino Agostini, defected with an escaped British POW, an RAF officer, sitting on his knees. The aircraft was then taken on charge by the RAF and transferred to the Central Fighter Establishment of Tangmere, Great Britain, on 17 March 1945, with the identification number VF204 applied, was put in the depot at Ford; its final fate is unrecorded.)

From that date on, the Centauro served with the Aeronautica Nazionale Repubblicana (ANR), the air force of the new fascist state created in North Italy by Mussolini, with the assistance of the Germans.
It still not exactly known how many "Centauros" were eventually requisitioned by the Luftwaffe or those acquired by ANR. About 18 aircraft were expropriated by the ANR while 12–20 (possibly as many as 42, according to some official reports) were requisitioned by the Germans.

The Fiat factory, in Turin under German control, continued production for about six months. On 25 April 1944, Fiat factories were heavily bombed: 15 G.55s were destroyed, as well as some trimotor Fiat G.12 transports, BR.20 bombers, and CR.42LW biplane fighters ordered by the Luftwaffe. 164 "Centauros" had been completed, 97 of them being produced after the Armistice and delivered to the ANR. Following the advice of Rüstungs und Kriegsproduktion Stab (RuK), the German Control Commission, production was dispersed in small cities of Monferrato and production of parts were assigned to CANSA of Novara and AVIA in Vercelli. The parts were then assembled in Turin where the aircraft were to be flown by test pilots Valentino Cus, Rolandi, Agostini and Catella. Production slowed markedly, and was stopped by the German authorities in September 1944. A total of 148 G.55s were delivered to the ANR and, when the factory was captured, 37 more examples were ready, while 73 were still on the production line, in various degrees of completion.

Operational history
The first Centauro to see operational use was the third prototype. On 21 March 1943, the aircraft was assigned to 20° Gruppo (squadron), 51° Stormo (wing) CT, based at Roma-Ciampino, for operational evaluation. In May, the G.55 followed the unit to Capoterra, near Cagliari having its baptism of fire on 5 June 1943, against Allied aircraft attacking Sardinia. The two first pre-production series flew, respectively, on 10 April and in May 1943. In early June they were assigned to 353a Squadriglia (flight) CT based in Foligno, Umbria, were, until August, were transferred nine more aircraft.
Pilots were delighted when they began to receive the new fighter in summer 1943.

In June, the first Serie I were assigned to Gruppo Complementare of 51° Stormo in Foligno, near Perugia, but in July the 11 G.55 of Gruppo Complementare were transferred to 353a Squadriglia, that already had in charge the "pre-series" machines, to operate from Roma-Ciampino Sud airfield. The 353a Squadriglia, commanded by Capitano Egeo Pittoni, flew many missions against the American bomber formations, but the flights were stopped when Rome was declared "Città aperta" (open city). On 27 August, the Squadriglie 351a and 352a left Sardinia and arrived in Foligno to be re-equipped with G.55. But at the date of the 8 September the G.55 had not been delivered yet.
During the first week of September, 12 Centauros had been assigned to 372a Squadriglia of 153° Gruppo in Torino-Mirafiori.
On 8 September 1943, the date of Armistice, the Regia Aeronautica had received 35 G.55s. Only one of them flew to southern Italy, accepting the invitation of Maresciallo d'Italia Pietro Badoglio to surrender to Allied forces.

ANR service
There still is no exact data about the G.55's captured by the Luftwaffe or acquired by Aeronautica Nazionale Repubblicana. About 18 G.55s were acquired by ANR while 12–20, or even 42, according to some reports, were requisitioned by the Luftwaffe.
The Centauro entered in service with the ANR; a decision was made to produce 500 G.55s, of which 300 were G.55/I and 200 G.55/II Serie II, armed with five 20 mm MG 151/20s and no machine guns (one in the centerline, two in the upper cowling, two in the wings). Only 148 were delivered to the ANR units that, as the number of available G.55s dwindled, were progressively re-equipped with the Bf 109G, of various sub-versions, even though Italian pilots preferred the G.55, with cancellation of production being extremely unpopular.

The ANR had two Gruppi Caccia terrestre (fighter squadrons), the first was initially equipped with the Macchi C.205, from November 1943 to May 1944, then, re-equipped with the G.55/I in June 1944 until it switched to the Bf 109G starting from November 1944. The 2nd Gruppo was the main unit equipped with the G.55, of which it had 70 examples from December 1943 – August 1944, before being progressively re-equipped with the Bf 109G.

The 2nd Gruppo was formed at Bresso. It was initially commanded by Lt Col Antonio Vizzoto, and later by Lt Col Aldo Alessandrini.
It had three Squadriglie (the 4th, Gigi Tre Osei, the 5th, Diavoli Rossi, and the 6th, Gamba di Ferro). The unit operated near Milan and Varese until April 1944, then it was transferred near Parma and Pavia, then again near the Lake Garda (Brescia and Verona). At the end of May, the 2° Gruppo gave its G.55s to 1° Gruppo and re-equipped with 46 ex I./JG 53 and II./JG 77 Bf 109G-6/R6

With the ANR, the G.55s gave a good account of themselves against Allied fighters like the Spitfire and Mustang.

German interest
In December 1942, a technical commission of the Regia Aeronautica was invited by the Luftwaffe to test some German aircraft in Rechlin. The visit was part of a joint plan for the standardization of the Axis aircraft production. In the same time, some Luftwaffe officers visited Guidonia where they were particularly interested in the performance promised by the Serie 5 fighters. On 9 December, these impressions were discussed in a Luftwaffe staff meeting and raised the interest of Hermann Göring himself. In February 1943, a German test commission was sent in Italy to evaluate the new Italian fighters. The commission was led by Oberst Petersen and was formed by Luftwaffe officers and pilots and by technical personnel, among them the Flugbaumeister Malz. The Germans also brought with them several aircraft including a Fw 190 A-5 and a Bf 109 G-4 for direct comparison tests in simulated dogfights.

The tests began 20 February 1943 with the German commission very impressed by the Italian aircraft, the G.55 in particular. In general, all the Serie 5 fighters were very good at low altitudes, but the G.55 was also competitive with its German opponents in term of speed and climb rate at high altitudes, while still maintaining superior handling characteristics. The definitive evaluation by the German commission was "excellent" for the G.55, "excellent" for the Re.2005 although very complicated to produce, and merely "average" for the C.205. Oberst Petersen defined the G.55 "the best fighter in the Axis" and immediately telegraphed his impressions to Göring. After listening to the recommendations of Petersen, Milch and Galland, a meeting held by Göring on 22 February 1943 voted to produce the G.55 in Germany.

German interest, apart from the good test results, derived also from the development possibilities they were able to see in the G.55 and in the Re.2005. Particularly, the G.55 was bigger and heavier and was considered a very good candidate for the new, significantly larger and more powerful DB 603 engine, which was considered too large to fit in the Bf 109's airframe. Other visits were organized in Germany during March and May 1943 in Rechlin and Berlin. The G.55 was again tested at Rechlin at the presence of Milch. Gabrielli and other FIAT personnel were invited to visit German factories and to discuss the evolution of the aircraft. The specifications of the German G55/II included the DB 603 engine, five 20 mm guns and a pressurized cockpit. The suggestion of weapons in the wings, limited to one 20 mm gun for each wing, originated the final configuration of the Serie I, while the DB 603 engine was successfully installed in what became the G.56 prototype. As a concrete expression of the German interest in the G.55, the Luftwaffe acquired three complete G.55/0 airframes (MM 91064-65-66) for evaluations and experiments providing three DB 603 engines and original machinery for the setup of other production line of the Italian copy of DB 605. Two of the Luftwaffe G.55's remained in Turin, at the Aeritalia plants, where they were used by German and Italian engineers to study the planned modifications and the possible optimizations to the production process. Later these two were converted to Serie I and delivered to the ANR. The third one was transferred to Rechlin for tests and experiments in Germany. The DB 603 engines were used to build the G.56 prototypes.

The interest in the G.55 program was still high after the Armistice. In October 1943, Kurt Tank, who previously personally tested a G.55 in Rechlin, and who had had nothing but praise for the aircraft, was in Turin to discuss G.55 production. However, events in the war and the not yet optimized production process were the reasons for which the G.55 program was eventually abandoned by the Luftwaffe. Early production of G.55 required about 15,000 man-hours; while there were estimates to reduce the effort to about 9,000 man-hours, the well-practiced German factories were able to assemble a Bf 109 in only 5,000 man-hours. The DB 603 were instead to be used in Tank's own Ta-152C.

Torpedo fighter

The Regia Aeronautica frequently used torpedo bombers to air-launch torpedoes, such as the trimotor SIAI-Marchetti SM.79 Sparviero medium bomber. These had some success in the early war years, inflicting considerable losses on Allied shipping in the Mediterranean. By late 1942 the ageing Sparviero was facing continually improving Allied fighters and anti aircraft defences, leading to the Italian general staff exploring the idea of using well-powered, single-engined heavy fighters to deliver torpedoes – a concept known later as the "torpedo fighter". Such aircraft, based near the Italian coast, could potentially have an operational range of 300–400 km (190–250 mi), would be capable of carrying a 680 kg (1,500 lb) torpedo (a shorter and more compact version of a weapon carried by the SM.79) at relatively high speed, and would also be better able to evade enemy fighters and/or combat them on equal terms.

While some consideration was given to adapting the G.55, Fiat began designing the G.57, a separate design powered by the 930 kW (1,250 hp) Fiat A.83 R.C.24/52 radial engine that was more capable of carrying a torpedo. Later, after the G.57 project was dropped, and given the ANR's continuing need for an aircraft that could replace the SM.79, the ANR engineers undertook the task of converting the Centauro for the torpedo attack role.

A production G.55 (military serial number MM. 91086) was modified to carry a 920 kg (2,030 lb), 5.46 m (17.91 ft) long torpedo. The engine coolant radiator, normally a single unit positioned on the belly of the fuselage under the cockpit area, was divided into two units mounted under the wing roots (similar to the layout used on the Bf 109), gaining a 90 cm (35 in) space where two racks were mounted to carry the torpedo. The tailwheel strut was lengthened and equipped with a strengthened shock absorber to keep the tailfins of the torpedo from striking the ground, and a drag-reducing cowling was added in front of the tailwheel to minimize drag from the lengthened strut. The G.55/S shared the same gun layout as the G.55/I, with the three MG 151/20s and the two Breda-SAFAT machine guns.

The aircraft, designated G.55/S, first flew in August 1944 and was successfully tested in January 1945, piloted by Adriano Mantelli. Despite the cumbersome external load, performance was good and the handling acceptable. The ANR ordered a pre-series of 10 examples and a production series of 100 aircraft, but the conclusion of the war put an end to the project. The G.55/S prototype survived the war and, after being converted back to the Serie I standard, it became the first G.55 to be delivered to the newly formed Aeronautica Militare Italiana (AMI).

Fiat G.56

The Fiat G.56 was essentially a Fiat G.55 with a larger German Daimler-Benz DB 603 engine. Two prototypes were built, flight tests starting in March 1944. On 30 March, Commander Valentino Cus reached speeds of 690/700 km/h (430/440 mph). Official maximum speed was 685 km/h (426 mph) and the aircraft was armed with three 20 mm MG 151/20 cannon, one firing through the propeller hub, the other two installed in the wings. Performance was excellent, the aircraft proving superior to both the Bf 109K and Bf 109G and Fw 190A, outmaneuvering   all types in testing. Production, however, was not allowed by the German authorities.

After World War II
In 1946, Fiat restarted production of the G.55, using the large stock of partly complete airframes and components remaining in its factories. It was available in two versions, the G.55A, a single-seat fighter/advanced trainer, and the G.55B, a two-seat advanced trainer, whose prototypes flew on 5 September 1946 and 12 February 1946 respectively.

The AMI acquired 19 G.55As and 10 G.55Bs, while the Argentine Air Force purchased 30 G.55As, and 15 G.55Bs. In September 1951, units of the Argentine Navy and Army attempted a military coup against the government of Juan Perón. The G.55s and the sole Argentine G.59 of Grupo 2 de Caza of the Argentine Air Force attempted to defect to the rebel forces, flying to the Punta Indio Naval Air Base. The pilots were arrested on arrival and the aircraft immobilised, however, and took no further part in the revolt, which was defeated by Loyalist forces.

G.59

The production of these orders for G.55s for Italy and Argentina caused the available stocks of the Italian licence-built version of the DB 605 engine to run short. As there was still a demand for the aircraft, it was decided to convert the type to use the more readily available Rolls-Royce Merlin engine, with the first conversion flying in early 1948. The conversion was successful, and the AMI decided to convert its G.55s to Merlin power, these re-entering service at the Lecce flying school in 1950 as the G.59-1A and G.59-1B (single- and two-seat versions).

Syria placed an order for 30 similar aircraft, which by this time, were completely from new production as the stocks of G.55 components had been exhausted. Of these, 26 were single-seaters (designated G.59-2A) and the remaining 4 two-seaters (G.59-2B). A single G.59-2A was acquired by Argentina for evaluation, but no further orders followed from the South American republic. The final versions were the G.59-4A single-seater and G.59-4B two-seater, which were fitted with bubble canopies for improved visibility. 20 G.59-4As and ten G.59-4Bs were produced by Italy.

Variants
G.55 3 prototypes.
G.55/0 16 pre-production aircraft.
G.55/1 Initial production aircraft.
G.55/2 Bomber interceptor version.
G.55/S Torpedo attack aircraft variant. S for silurante meaning torpedo.
G.55/A,B Single-seat/twin-seat trainer versions, developed after the conflict.
G.56 2 prototypes with  Daimler-Benz DB 603A engines.
G.57 Version planned with A  Fiat A.83 R.C.24/52 radial engine.
G.59-1A Rolls-Royce Merlin powered single-seat advanced trainers converted from G.55s
G.59-1B Rolls-Royce Merlin powered two-seat trainers converted from G.55s
G.59-2A 26, new production, Rolls-Royce Merlin powered single-seaters for Syria
G.59-2B 4, new production, Rolls-Royce Merlin powered two-seat trainers for Syria
G.59-4A 20, new production, Rolls-Royce Merlin powered single-seaters for the Aeronautica Militare Italiana, fitted with bubble canopies.
G.59-4B 10, new production, Rolls-Royce Merlin powered two-seaters for the Aeronautica Militare Italiana, fitted with bubble canopies.

Operators

 Argentine Air Force

 Royal Egyptian Air Force

 Regia Aeronautica

 Aeronautica Nazionale Repubblicana

 Italian Air Force  operated 74 Fiat G.59  retired in 1965

 Syrian Air Force

Specifications (G.55/I)

See also

References

Notes

Bibliography
 Angelucci, Enzo and Paolo Matricardi. World Aircraft: World War II, Volume I (Sampson Low Guides). Maidenhead, UK: Sampson Low, 1978. .
 Arena, Nino. I Caccia Della Serie 5, Re2005, Mc205, Fiat G.G5 (in Italian). Modena, Italy: STEM-Mucchi, 1976. .
 Arena, Nino. Fiat G55 Centauro – Fiat G59(in Italian). Modena, Italy: Mucchi Editore, 1994.
 Beale, Nick, Ferdinando D'Amico and Gabriele Valentini. Air War Italy, Axis Air Forces from Liberation of Rome to the Surrender. Shrewsbury, UK: Airlife, 1996. .
 D'Amico, Ferdinando and Gabriele Valentini.Pictorial History of the Regia Aeronautica Vol.2 – Pictorial History of the Aeronautica Nazionale Repubblicana and the Italian Co-Belligerent Air Force 1943–1945. Carrollton, Texas: Squadron/Signal Publications, 1986. .
 Di Terlizzi, Maurizio. Fiat G.55 Centauro (bilingual Italian/English). Roma, Italy: IBN Editore, 2001. .
 Dimensione Cielo: Aerei Italiani nella 2° Guerra Mondiale, Caccia Assalto 3 (in Italian). Rome: Edizioni Bizzarri, 1972.
 Ethell, Jeffrey L. Aircraft of World War II. Glasgow: HarperCollins/Jane's, 1995. .
 Green, William. War Planes of the Second World War: Fighters, Volume Two. London: Macdonald & Co. (Publishers) Ltd., 1961.
 Green, William and Gordon Swanborough, eds. "Centaur – The Final Fling." Air Enthusiast International. Volume 6, Number 5, May 1974,  pp. 233–239, 261–262.
 Green, William and Gordon Swanborough. The Complete Book of Fighters. New York: Smithmark Publishers Inc., 1994. .
 Gunston, Bill. The Illustrated Directory of Fighting Aircraft of World War II. London: Salamander Books Limited, 1988. .
 Hagedorn, Dan. Latin American Air Wars and Aircraft 1912–1969. Crowborough, UK: Hikoki Publications, 2006. .
 Jackson, Robert. Aircraft of World War II – Development – Weaponry – Specifications. Enderby, Silverdale Books. 2003. .
 Malizia, Nicola. Fiat G.59. Roma, Italy: IBN Editore, 2004. .
 Matricardi, Paolo. Aerei militari: Caccia e Ricognitori. Milano: Mondadori Electa, 2006
 Mondey, David. The Hamlyn Concise Guide to Axis Aircraft of World War II. London: Bounty Books, 2006. .
 Nicolle, David. "Arab-Italian Fighters: Fiats and Macchis in Egyptian and Syrian Service 1948-1956". Air Enthusiast, No. 55, Autumn 1994, pp. 32–36. 
 Sgarlato, Nico. I caccia della Serie 5. Parma: Delta Editrice, 2009. 
 Sgarlato, Nico. Italian Aircraft of World War II. Warren, Michigan: Squadron/Signal Publications, Inc., 1979. .
 Thompson, Jonathan W. Italian Civil and Military Aircraft, 1930–1945. Fallbrook, CA: Aero Publishers, 1963.
 Vergnano, Piero and Gregory Alegi.  "Fiat G.55." Ali D'Italia #10 (in Italian/English). Torino, Italy:  La Bancarella Aeronautica, 1998.
 Winchester, Jim. "Fiat G.55 Centauro." Aircraft of World War II: The Aviation Factfile. Kent, UK: Grange Books plc, 2004. .

Further reading

External links

 Virtual G55 project
 Fiat G.55 Centauro

G.055
1940s Italian fighter aircraft
World War II Italian fighter aircraft
Single-engined tractor aircraft
Low-wing aircraft
Aircraft first flown in 1942